Puerto Rico Highway 155 (PR-155) is a rural road that goes from Coamo, Puerto Rico to Vega Baja through Orocovis and Morovis. It extends from PR-14 in downtown Coamo to PR-2 east of downtown Vega Baja.

Major intersections

See also

 List of highways numbered 155

References

External links
 

155